Woo Ji-seok (born May 11, 1990), commonly known by his stage name Taewoon or ₩uNo is a South Korean rapper, singer, songwriter and record producer. He is a former member of the boy band Speed and pop group Coed School.

Biography 
Woo Ji-seok was born on May 11, 1990 in Mapo, Seoul, South Korea. Woo lived in Japan for three years and studied at the Tokyo Polytechnic University. He and his younger brother Zico were both trainees for Block B, but left before debuting and later joined Core Contents Media (Later known as MBK Entertainment).

Career

Coed School (2010)

On September 30, 2010, Woo  made his debut as a member of Coed School with the release of their digital single "Too Late", followed by their second digital single "Bbiribbom Bberibbom" three weeks later. The group then released their mini-album "Something That Is Cheerful And Fresh" a month after their official debut. Due to various scandals with some of the male members in late 2010, MBK Entertainment decided to debut a female sub-unit F-ve Dolls in February 2011, consisting of the group female members, and a new member Eunkyo. A year after, in February 2012, the male members debuted in the male sub-unit Speed. A representative of MBK Entertainment revealed in the middle of 2013 that they had no plans for Coed School to reform again, as both of its sub-units had grown and changed their line-ups to become independent groups.

Speed (2012 to 2015)

Speed first released their male cover of T-ara's single "Lovey Dovey", which they titled "Lovey Dovey Plus". Woo then became the leader of Coed School's subgroup Speed.

They made their official debut on January 17, 2013, with the song "It's Over", an electronic dance song. The 15-minute drama music video for their debut track is based on the Gwangju Uprising and features actors such as Park Bo-young, Ji Chang-wook, Ha Seok-jin and A Pink's Naeun.

In October 2013, Woo and Sejoon (of Speed) went to Los Angeles to meet with Ray J and other rappers in order to record a new song and music video.

In March 2015, Woo withdrew from the group for pursue solo career while MBK still managed him.

Solo activities 
In December 2012, Woo released a solo track called "Saturday Night".

Woo also has a rap group called "Royal Class", including himself, Roydo, Chancey The Glow, Sims of M.I.B, Konquest, KittiB and Mino from Winner.

In 2015, Woo participated in the Mnet program Show Me The Money 4.

In 2017, he joined Mix Nine. He placed 20th for the males, failing to enter the top 9 who were later chosen as the winning team to debut.

Producer work
In February 2014, Speed released a comeback album produced by Woo, Speed Circus, as well as the music videos "Why I'm Not" and "Don't Tease Me". In the same month, Taewoon released another solo track entitled "Focus".

In early 2015, Woo signed to MillionMarket and using name ₩uNo as music producer.

Discography

Mixtape

Songwriting Credits

Filmography

Television dramas

Variety shows

References

External links
 
 

1990 births
Living people
MBK Entertainment artists
South Korean male rappers
South Korean singer-songwriters
South Korean record producers
South Korean male idols
Rappers from Seoul
Show Me the Money (South Korean TV series) contestants
South Korean male singer-songwriters
Mix Nine contestants